Huanghou may refer to:

Empress of China
Huanghou Township, Nanzhao County, Henan, China